Directorate General of Intelligence and Investigation (D.G. I&I) is a department of Federal Board of Revenue, Pakistan.  It mostly works as an intelligence arm of Federal Board of Revenue but its day-to-day work involves investigations of revenue related crime and offenses as well. Usually having officers from the Inland Revenue Serive of FBR, it acts on the information from other law enforcement agencies, informants on its pay roll and corporate whistle blowers. D.G. I&I functions with three Regional Offices headed by Directors at Karachi, Lahore and Islamabad. Regional Directors Karachi and Lahore are assisted by three Additional Directors. These Additional Directors are responsible for Vigilance, Customs and Sales Tax, Corporate and Direct Tax. The Islamabad Regional Director have five Additional Directors which are Addl. Dir. Headquarters, Addl. Dir. Islamabad Vigilance, Addl. Dir. Customs, Sales and Central Excise, Addl. Dir. Peshawar and Addl. Dir. Quetta. Vigilance Wings at Peshawar and Quetta are headed by Deputy Directors.

History

Directorate of Customs Intelligence and Investigation was created as an attached department of Revenue Division on 12 August 1957 headed by a Director with HQs at Karachi. Three Regional Offices of the Directorate were established at Chittagong (then East Pakistan), Lahore and Karachi. Central Excise Work was entrusted to the Directorate on 18 June 1974. It was in 1984 that the HQs of the Directorate were shifted to Islamabad from Karachi. The department was up-graded on 21-2-1985 and it was headed by Director General. In 1995, the Directorate General was assigned the role to carry out detailed audit of cases of Sales Tax fraud. The Directorate General shifted into its own premises in Sector G-10/4 Islamabad in August 2004. In 2005 the Directorate General was assigned the additional responsibilities of Integrity Management. Consequent upon restructuring under reform process, Directorate General of Intelligence and Investigation (Customs, Sales Tax & Federal Excise) was re-designated as Directorate General of Intelligence & Investigation – FBR, Islamabad with the responsibility of both Direct and Indirect Taxes.

D.G. I&I Charter Of Functions

To collect information and intelligence about evasion of Customs, Federal Excise duties and Sales Tax and smuggling of contraband, including narcotics.

To perform enforcement duties and to carry out preventive operations throughout the country related to smuggling, evasion of federal taxes through clandestine removal of dutiable goods, mis-declaration, valuation frauds, fraudulent claims of refund and rebate etc. and to detect and investigate cases cognizable under the Prevention of Smuggling Act, 1977.

To collect and consolidate reports of significant seizures of contraband and smuggled goods, including narcotics, made by law enforcement agencies in Pakistan.

To maintain on all Pakistan basis a computerized record and index of the known smugglers, their financiers and associations.

To prepare periodical reports about trends of smuggling of goods of foreign origin with a view to suggest fiscal measures to prevent illicit trade of all kinds.

To coordinate with Pakistan Missions abroad, the counterpart organizations and narcotics agencies of the member countries of the WCO for collection and dissemination of information.

To look into and investigate cases of corruption and malpractices received by the Directorate from the public, press or through any other source against the officers and staff of the revenue collecting agencies under the Federal Board of Revenue and propose appropriate action.

Pakistani intelligence agencies
Ministry of Finance (Pakistan)